Jeff Trembecky  (born October 19, 1974) is a Canadian former professional ice hockey and inline hockey player.

Trembecky attended the University of Alaska Fairbanks where he played three seasons (1995 – 1998) of NCAA hockey with the Alaska Nanooks, scoring 52 goals and 45 assists for 97 points, while earning 127 penalty minutes, in 114 games played.

Trembecky began his professional career in the ECHL, where he played the 1998–99 season with the Peoria Rivermen. He skated the next season in the ECHL with both the Pensacola Ice Pilots and the Trenton Titans, before moving to the Central Hockey League for the 2000–01 season where he suited up with the San Antonio Iguanas. He returned to the ECHL for the 2001–02 to compete with both the Cincinnati Cyclones and Baton Rouge Kingfish to conclude his North American play.

The 2002-03 season saw Trembecky skate in the British National League with the Fife Flyers, Newcastle Vipers, and Solihull MK Kings.

He found his place during the 2003-04 season while playing in the Netherlands' Eredivisie with the Tilburg Trappers where he was the top playoffs goal scorer.  He stayed with the Trappers for three seasons before retiring following the 2005-06 season.

Inline hockey
He played with the Chicago Bluesmen of Roller Hockey International during their 1999 season.

References

External links
 

1974 births
Living people
Alaska Nanooks men's ice hockey players
Baton Rouge Kingfish players
Canadian ice hockey centres
Cincinnati Cyclones (ECHL) players
Fife Flyers players
Newcastle Vipers players
Pensacola Ice Pilots players
Peoria Rivermen (ECHL) players
San Antonio Iguanas players
Solihull MK Kings players
Tilburg Trappers players
Trenton Titans players
People from Drumheller
Ice hockey people from Alberta
Chicago Bluesmen players
Canadian expatriate ice hockey players in England
Canadian expatriate ice hockey players in Scotland
Canadian expatriate ice hockey players in the United States
Canadian expatriate ice hockey players in the Netherlands